Amod Lloyd Field (born October 11, 1967) is a former American football wide receiver who played one season with the Phoenix Cardinals of the National Football League. He played college football at Montclair State University and attended Passaic High School in Passaic, New Jersey. He was also a member of the BC Lions, Tampa Bay Storm, Massachusetts Marauders, San Jose SaberCats, Orlando Predators, Connecticut Coyotes, New Jersey Red Dogs and New York CityHawks. Field was also an assistant coach for the Montclair State Red Hawks and New Jersey Red Dogs. He was inducted into the Montclair State Athletics Hall of Fame in 2000.

References

External links
Just Sports Stats

Living people
1967 births
Players of American football from New Jersey
American football wide receivers
Canadian football wide receivers
African-American players of American football
African-American players of Canadian football
Montclair State Red Hawks football players
Phoenix Cardinals players
BC Lions players
Tampa Bay Storm players
Massachusetts Marauders players
San Jose SaberCats players
Orlando Predators players
Connecticut Coyotes players
New Jersey Red Dogs players
New York CityHawks players
Montclair State Red Hawks football coaches
Cleveland Gladiators coaches
Sportspeople from Passaic, New Jersey
Passaic High School alumni
21st-century African-American people
20th-century African-American sportspeople